Layyah is the name of a suburb of the city of Sharjah, United Arab Emirates (UAE). It is the site of the city's main power station and desalination plant.

At the turn of the 20th century, Sharjah had some 4 or 5 shops in Layyah and a bazaar of some 200 shops in Sharjah proper.

References

Populated places in the Emirate of Sharjah